The XV Constitutional Government of São Tomé and Príncipe (Portuguese: XV Governo Constitucional de São Tomé e Príncipe) was a Government of São Tomé and Príncipe. It was established on 12 December 2012 and it was disestablished on 24 November 2014.

References

2012 establishments in São Tomé and Príncipe
Cabinets established in 2012
Government of São Tomé and Príncipe
2014 disestablishments in São Tomé and Príncipe